Backovic or Backović is a surname. Notable people with the surname include: 

 Marko Backovic (born 1997), British-Serbian basketball player
 Slobodan Backović (born 1946), Montenegrin politician and nuclear physicist

Slavic-language surnames